This is an incomplete list of Filipino full-length films, both mainstream and independently produced, released in theaters and cinemas in 2016.

Top ten grossing films

The highest-grossing Filipino films released in 2016, by domestic box office gross revenue, are as follows:

1.  The Super Parental Guardians earned an estimated total of ₱ 598,000,000 which includes international gross.
2.  Barcelona: A Love Untold earned an estimated total of ₱ 321,000,000 which includes international gross.
3.  The Unmarried Wife earned an estimated total of ₱ 246,300,000 which includes international gross.
4.  Everything About Her earned an estimated total of ₱ 208,000,000 which includes international gross.
5.  Vince and Kath and James earned an estimated total of ₱ 123,000,000 which includes international gross.
6.  Just the 3 of Us earned an estimated international gross of $ 4,900,000.
7. The Third Party earned an estimated total of ₱ 110,00,000 which includes international gross.

Films

January–March
Color key

April–June
Color key

July–September
Color key

October–December
Color key

Awards

Local
The following first list shows the Best Picture winners at the four major film awards: FAMAS Awards, Gawad Urian Awards, Luna Awards and Star Awards; and at the three major film festivals: Metro Manila Film Festival, Cinemalaya and Cinema One Originals. The second list shows films with the most awards won from the four major film awards and a breakdown of their total number of awards per award ceremony.

International
The following list shows Filipino films (released in 2016) which were nominated or won awards at international industry-based awards and FIAPF-accredited competitive film festivals.

References

Lists of 2016 films by country or language